The Anchitheriinae are an extinct subfamily of the Perissodactyla family Equidae, the same family which includes modern horses, zebras and donkeys. This subfamily is more primitive than the living members of the family.  The group first appeared with Mesohippus in North America during the middle Eocene and thrived until the late Miocene.  The subfamily continued in Eurasia with the genus Sinohippus until the early Pliocene, when it finally became extinct. This subfamily were considered browsers with their more ancestral low-crowned molars, in contrast with the modern, specialized grazer species today.

References
 Paleobiology Database
 Horse Phylogeny

Prehistoric horses
Eocene first appearances
Zanclean extinctions
Fossil taxa described in 1869